Nova Vodolaha Raion was a raion (district) in the Kharkiv Oblast of Ukraine. Its administrative center was the urban-type settlement of Nova Vodolaha. The raion was abolished on 18 July 2020 as part of the administrative reform of Ukraine, which reduced the number of raions of Kharkiv Oblast to seven. The area of Nova Vodolaha Raion was split between Kharkiv and Krasnohrad Raions. The last estimate of the raion population was 

At the time of disestablishment, the raion consisted of two hromadas:
 Nova Vodolaha settlement hromada with the administration in Nova Vodolaha, transferred to Kharkiv Raion;
 Starovirivka rural hromada with the administration in the selo of Starovirivka, transferred to Krasnohrad Raion.

References

Former raions of Kharkiv Oblast
1923 establishments in Ukraine
Ukrainian raions abolished during the 2020 administrative reform